Andrea Galgó Ferenci (also rendered as: Andrea Galgó-Ferenci; ; born 8 November 1973) is a politician in Serbia from the country's Hungarian national minority community. She was briefly a member of the National Assembly of Serbia in 2007, serving with the Alliance of Vojvodina Hungarians (Vajdasági Magyar Szövetség, VMSZ).

Early life and private career
Galgó Ferenci was born in Bečej, Vojvodina, in what was then the Socialist Republic of Serbia in the Socialist Federal Republic of Yugoslavia. She is a graduate of the Faculty of Economics at the Subotica campus of the University of Novi Sad and is a professor at the Higher School of Economics and Commerce in Bečej.

Politician
Galgó Ferenci was given the 157th position on the VMSZ's electoral list in the 2007 Serbian parliamentary election. The list won three mandates, and she was subsequently included in the party's assembly delegation. (From 2000 to 2011, Serbian parliamentary mandates were awarded to sponsoring parties or coalitions rather than to individual candidates, and it was common practice for the mandates to be assigned out of numerical order. Galgó Ferenci's position on the list had no formal bearing on her chances of election.) The VMSZ served in opposition to Vojislav Koštunica's government during this period.

Galgó Ferenci was appointed as a substitute member of Serbia's delegation to the Parliamentary Assembly of the Council of Europe (PACE) on 25 June 2007. She did not serve with any of the assembly's parliamentary groupings.

She resigned from the national assembly on 16 July 2007. Her membership in the PACE, which was conditional on her continued membership in the national assembly, came to an end on 1 October 2007.

She received the ninth position on the electoral list of the Hungarian Coalition, a multi-party alliance led by the VMSZ, for the Bečej municipal assembly in the 2008 Serbian local elections. The list won a plurality victory with thirteen out of thirty-six seats, although she did not take a mandate afterward.

In 2011, Serbia's electoral system was reformed such that mandates were awarded in numerical order to candidates on successful lists. Galgó Ferenci appeared in the thirty-fifth position (out of thirty-six) on the VMSZ's list for Bečej in the 2012 Serbian local elections. This was too low for election to be a realistic prospect, and indeed she was not elected when the list won eight mandates. During the negotiations for a new local coalition government after the election, Galgö Ferenci and Ištvan Acsai left the VMSZ to form a local citizen's group called For Bečej. On 16 July 2012, she was appointed to the Bečej municipal council (i.e., the executive branch of the local government) with responsibility for education, culture, and civil society. She was dropped from the council on 29 January 2015, when the VMSZ joined the local government.

References

1973 births
Living people
People from Bečej
Members of the National Assembly (Serbia)
Members of the Parliamentary Assembly of the Council of Europe
Alliance of Vojvodina Hungarians politicians
Women members of the National Assembly (Serbia)